A home improvement center, home improvement store, or home center is a retail store that combines the functions of a hardware store with those of a lumber yard. Major North American home-improvement center chains include Home Depot, Lowe's, Menards, and Rona. Home improvement stores typically sell building supplies, tools, and lumber.

References

Home improvement
Hardware stores
Retailers by type of merchandise sold